David Lynch is a Gaelic footballer who plays at senior level for the Westmeath county team.

Lynch was a member of the team that defeated Dublin at Parnell Park in the 2019 O'Byrne Cup final, his county's first time to win that trophy since 1988. He won his second piece of silverware of 2019 when Westmeath won the 2019 National Football League Division 3 title by a goal against Laois at Croke Park.

Lynch later won the 2022 Tailteann Cup, and played in the final. He is a teacher by trade.

Honours
Westmeath
 Tailteann Cup (1): 2022
 National Football League Division 3 (1): 2019
 O'Byrne Cup (1): 2019

References

Year of birth missing (living people)
Living people
Irish schoolteachers
Westmeath inter-county Gaelic footballers